Pollenia tenuiforceps is a species of cluster fly in the family Polleniidae.

Distribution
Algeria, Bosnia and Herzegovina, Czech Republic, France, Hungary, Romania, Slovakia, Slovenia, Switzerland, Ukraine.

References

Polleniidae
Insects described in 1928
Diptera of Europe
Diptera of Africa